Stary Lyp is a rural locality (a village) in Polozovoskoye Rural Settlement, Bolshesosnovsky District, Perm Krai, Russia. The population was 72 as of 2010. There are 2 streets.

Geography 
Stary Lyp is located on the Lyp River, 49 km southwest of Bolshaya Sosnova (the district's administrative centre) by road. Nizhny Lyp is the nearest rural locality.

References 

Rural localities in Bolshesosnovsky District